These companies are licensed by Capital Market Authority Uganda:
 1Stock Limited
 African Alliance Uganda Limited
 GenAfrica Asset Managers Limited
 ICEA Asset Management (U) Limited
 PCP Uganda Limited
 PineBridge Investment Co. Limited
 STANLIB Uganda Limited
 UAP Financial Services
 Vestoq Limited
 XENO Technologies Uganda Limited

References

External links
 Asset Management Company (AMC) Definition | Investopedia
 Capital Market Authority Uganda
 Licensed firms by CMA Uganda

Fund

Asset management